Rondos District is one of seven districts of the province Lauricocha in the Huanuco Region of Peru.
 The town of Rondos is the capital of the district and had a population of 826 in 2017. The town is situated on a mesa overlooking the junction of the Lauricocha and Nupe Rivers,  in elevation below Rondos, to form the Marañon River. The headwaters of both the Lauricocha and Nupe rivers have been proposed as sources of the Amazon River.

Climate

The high elevation of Rondos impacts the climate which is typically cool and cloudy. The nearest weather station at San Miguel de Cauri,  distant from Rondos, gets  of precipitation annually. Most is between October and April with a distinct dry season from May to September. The frost-free growing season is about 290 days long between 22 August and 8 June although freezing temperatures are possible from May to September.

References